The Lada Priora is a compact car produced by the Russian automaker AvtoVAZ since March 2007. It is largely a restyled and modernised Lada 110 and replaced it in 2009. By May 16, 2012, 590,000 Prioras had been produced. Starting model year 2016, the Priora is not available for export market and has been replaced by Lada Vesta (but is still available domestically).

July 16, 2018 in the network appeared a photo of the last body LADA Priora in the welding shop of the car factory, decorated with colored balloons and covered with a poster with the inscription "Последний!" ("Last!"). The photo was taken on July 13 at about 2 pm (on the poster in the photo there is another date - July 11). The model will still be assembled using previously welded bodies, including the last, a few days. On July 17, 2018 AutoVAZ confirmed the cessation of Priora production in an official release.

Body styles

 VAZ-2170: base sedan (produced since March 2007);
 VAZ-2171 Universal: station wagon (produced since May 2009);
 VAZ-2172: 5-door hatchback (produced since February, 2008);
 VAZ-2172 Coupé: 3-door hatchback, based on the 5-door hatchback (limited production since 18 January 2010);
 VAZ-21708 Priora Premier: long-wheelbase version of the sedan, with an extra 175 mm  Small-scale production by AvtoVAZ partner ZAO Super-Avto. Equipped with a 120 hp 1.8-liter VAZ-21128 engine (low volume production since the autumn of 2008)

Also, convertible versions are going to be produced in small numbers, according to the demand.

In June 2011, AvtoVAZ announced that they will offer soon a version with a 90 hp engine, the weight will be reduced by 39% compared to the 98 hp basic engine. The engine will be more long-lasting with up to 200,000 km mileage.

In August 2011 a new version named Lada Priora CNG was announced. It is powered by gasoline and Compressed natural gas (CNG). The fuel tank capacity is also 43 liter and the four gas tanks 96 liter.

On May 22, 2018, AvtoVAZ announced the long-rumored end of Priora sedan production by July 2018; hatchback and station wagon had already ended production by end of 2015 as sedan accounted for over 80 percent of sales mix.

However, as has informed "Avtosreda", the press service of AVTOVAZ, the specific decisions on this issue are still pending.
"A model of demand, its production continues," - so said "Avtosreda", the press service of the company.

Equipment

Base Prioras comes with a standard driver's side airbag and electric power steering. Since May 2008, Lada Priora offers a «Lux» package, which includes passenger airbag (and more recently front side airbags), seat belt pretensioners in the front seats, ABS and parking sensors. In addition, some packages add standard air conditioning with climate control, integrated audio with bluetooth handsfree, heated front seats, automatic headlamps, and rain sensor. In April 2010, an optional multimedia system was added to the options list, followed by a navigation system in early 2011. On the other hand, electronic stability control and fully automatic transmission are not offered.

The car received a 1.6 L engine with 16 valves and a new transmission, designed to transfer torque of 145 N·m, and a box set of closed transmission bearings with an extended lifespan.

Lada Priora 1.6 AMT (106 hp), equipped with an automated manual transmission, debuted in 2014. The AMT gearbox is made on the base of a standard five-speed manual transmission, but was supplemented with electro-hydraulic actuators and an electronic control unit of the ZF Group.

Motorsport

The LADA Sport team contested the latter part of the 2009 World Touring Car Championship season with a trio of Prioras, having started the season with Lada 110s.

Safety
The car scored 5.4 points out of 16 in a frontal crash test conducted by the Russian ARCAP safety assessment program in 2007, and was awarded one star out of four. A newer version of the car scored 10.6 points out of 16.

Gallery

References

External links

Official Lada Priora website
Super Auto Page (Russian)
Lada Priora Club page (Russian)

Priora
Compact cars
Sedans
Hatchbacks
Station wagons
Cars introduced in 2007
Cars of Russia
2010s cars
Touring cars
ARCAP small family cars